The 2017 Women's World Draughts Championship at the international draughts held in Tallinn, Estonia International Draughts Federation FMJD. Sixteen female players in total was competing in the tournament. The tournament started on October 1, 2017, and lasted on October 15, 2017. Three round played in hotel Europe, other – at Paul Keres Chess House. It played as a round-robin, with 15 rounds in total. The winning prize for the tournament is 20,000 euros. At the same time the 2017 World Draughts Championship was held.

Women's World Draughts Champion Natalia Sadowska (Poland) and former champion Zoja Golubeva (Latvia) participated in competition. New world champion became Zoja Golubeva.

Rules and regulations
The games will be played in the official FMJD time rate of the Fischer system with 1 hour and 20 minutes for the game plus 1 minute per move. Conforming to the FMJD regulations players are not allowed to agree on a draw before they both made 40 moves. If they do so nevertheless, the referee is obliged to decide on a 0-point each players.

The final classification will be based on the total points obtained. If two or more players will have same total points to define the places:

 1. the largest number of victories
 2. the best results between this players
 3. the best results obtained in order of the classification.

Schedule

Results

* GMIF — women's international grandmaster

* MIF — women's international master

* MFF — master FMJD

See also
List of women's Draughts World Championship winners
Women's World Draughts Championship

References

External links
WC 2017.Rules & Regulations
World Championship Women 2017
Offiсial site
List of players
Results
Results on site KNDB

2017 in draughts
Draughts world championships
Sports competitions in Tallinn
2017 in Estonian sport
International sports competitions hosted by Estonia
October 2017 sports events in Europe